Psamathocrita doloma is a moth of the family Gelechiidae. It was described by John David Bradley in 1965. It is found in Uganda.

References

Moths described in 1965
Psamathocrita